Leopold Eustachius Czapek (15 November 1792, Český Krumlov, Bohemia – 1840, Iliria) was an Austrian pianist and composer. He was friends with Frédéric Chopin and corresponded regularly with him. Among his own compositions is a variation on a theme, a waltz by Anton Diabelli, for the Vaterländischer Künstlerverein.

References

1792 births
1840 deaths
Austrian male composers
Austrian composers
People from Český Krumlov
19th-century male musicians
19th-century musicians